Woodhouse House in Virginia Beach, Virginia, also known as Fountain House or Simmons House, was built in 1810 in the Federal architecture style.  It was listed on the National Register of Historic Places in 2007. It is located south of the Virginia Beach Courthouse complex, still surrounded by farm land but facing increasing encroachment by suburban homes.

The house is a wood frame two-story structure with a brick American bond chimney with Flemish bond headers and asphalt shingles. The kitchen and smokehouse were built in 1904. Also on the property are a "mid-20th century garage, shed, well, and barn, and late 20th century swimming pool." Woodhouse and Simmons family cemeteries are also on the property. The Woodhouse cemetery, where Thomas is buried, is near a dilapidated barn. The Simmons cemetery is detached from the main structures and is at the northeast corner of the property.

The property was originally  in size, which Captain Thomas Woodhouse bought from John Frizzell in 1811. Woodhouse died in 1813 at age 39 and willed the property to his brother, Henry Woodhouse. Henry sold the property, now  in size, to Andrew Simmons in 1849. In 1889 William sold the land to Reuben Fountain, who lived on adjoining land. The Fountain family still owns the property. The home is one of the few buildings of its type in Virginia Beach, representing the transition from Colonial and Georgian architecture to Federal style in the region.

See also 

 National Register of Historic Places listings in Virginia Beach, Virginia

References

External links 
 Department of Historic Resources photos
 

Federal architecture in Virginia
Houses completed in 1810
Houses on the National Register of Historic Places in Virginia
Houses in Virginia Beach, Virginia
National Register of Historic Places in Virginia Beach, Virginia
Historic American Buildings Survey in Virginia